Kumlevollvatnet or Kongevollvatnet is a lake in the municipality of Flekkefjord in Agder county, Norway.

See also
List of lakes in Norway

References

Flekkefjord
Lakes of Agder